Thirteen is a 2003 teen drama film directed by Catherine Hardwicke, written by Hardwicke and Nikki Reed, and starring Holly Hunter, Evan Rachel Wood and Reed. Loosely based on Reed's life from ages 12 to 13, the film's plot follows Tracy, a seventh grade student in Los Angeles who begins dabbling in substance abuse, sex and crime after being befriended by a troubled classmate. It features Brady Corbet, Deborah Kara Unger, Kip Pardue and Vanessa Hudgens (in her film debut) in supporting roles.

The screenplay for Thirteen was written over a period of six days by Hardwicke and the then-14-year-old Reed; Hardwicke, a former production designer, independently raised funds herself for the production. Filming took place on location in Los Angeles in 2002, largely shot with hand-held cameras.

Upon the film's debut at the Sundance Film Festival in January 2003, Hardwicke won the Sundance Directing (Drama) for the film. Fox Searchlight Pictures subsequently acquired Thirteen for distribution, giving the film a limited release in the United States beginning on August 20, 2003; the release would expand in September 2003 and the film went on to gross a total of $4.6 million at the U.S. box office.

Though it received numerous favorable reviews from critics, Thirteen generated some controversy for its depiction of youth drug use (including inhalants, marijuana, LSD and alcohol), underage sexual behavior, and self-harm. The film earned Hunter an Academy Award nomination for Best Supporting Actress and Golden Globe nominations for Hunter and Wood for Best Supporting Actress and Best Actress in a Drama, respectively.

Plot
13-year-old Tracy Freeland begins her school year as a smart and mild-mannered honors student at a middle school in Los Angeles. Her divorced mother, Melanie, is a recovering alcoholic, who struggles to support Tracy and her older brother, Mason, by working as a hairdresser. Tracy feels ignored by her mother, who is too busy with her fellow ex-addict boyfriend Brady to address Tracy's increasing issues with her body image. Tracy also occasionally cuts herself in order to relieve stress.

On the first day of 7th grade, Tracy encounters Evie Zamora, the most popular girl in Tracy's class. After being teased by Evie's friends for her "Cabbage Patch" clothes, Tracy is upset and decides to shed her "little girl" image. At a store owned by Melanie's friend, Tracy, much to her excitement, finds trendier clothes as Melanie offers a few dollars in loose change as payment.  

The following day Tracy wears one of her new outfits to school. At lunch she sits near, and observes, Evie, and eventually sees Evie leave for the bathroom and follows her. Evie, seemingly realizing Tracy is following her, compliments Tracy's new outfit. Tracy, in turn, compliments Evie. After a quick once over, Evie invites Tracy to go shopping on Melrose Avenue in Hollywood, writing her phone number down on an address pad Tracy provides.

Excited and hopeful, Tracy calls the number after school, but after two attempts realizes that Evie gave her a fake phone number to prank her. Nevertheless, Tracy determinedly shows up on Melrose Avenue and meets with Evie and her friend Astrid. Evie and Astrid seem surprised and amused that Tracy showed up, laughing at her as soon as she arrives. Tracy witnesses the two shoplifting and excuses herself from the store. She sits outside on a bench and moments later a distracted woman sits next to her. The woman's purse falls open, revealing her wallet, which Tracy takes. She finds Evie and Astrid and, elated, the three go on a shopping spree with the stolen money.

When she arrives home, Tracy finds out that Melanie has invited Brady over for dinner that night. A flashback shows Brady violently withdrawing from drugs, a scene that traumatized Tracy.

Tracy and Evie eventually become inseparable. Evie introduces Tracy to her world of sex, drugs, and crime, much to Tracy's delight. Evie tells Melanie that Brooke, her adult cousin and guardian, is out of town for two weeks, and Melanie agrees to let her stay at her home with Tracy. While staying there, Evie discovers Tracy's cutting addiction. Although Melanie is concerned about the change in Tracy's behavior and worries about the extent of Evie's influence, she cannot find a way to intervene. Melanie attempts to send Evie home, but reluctantly lets her stay after Evie claims her guardian's boyfriend is physically abusive. As Tracy and Evie become closer, Tracy shuts Melanie further out of her life and begins to disrespect her more.

Evie and Tracy get increasingly out of control, each egging the other on. The pair attempt to seduce Tracy's neighbor Luke, a lifeguard in his early twenties, who kicks them out of his house. Melanie decides to have a family movie night with Tracy, Brady, and Evie, but, behind Melanie's back, the two girls ditch the cinema to go get high on the streets in Hollywood. While getting drinks at a shop, Tracy is spotted by Mason, who is shocked when he sees Tracy wearing sexualized clothing, including thong underwear. Upon finding out that the girls snuck out, Tracy and Melanie get into a screaming match at home. After the argument, Melanie makes a mess in the kitchen and rips the floor out of rage. Later on, the girls take turns inhaling from a can of gas duster for electronics and become so intoxicated that they start hitting and punching each other.

Melanie attempts to break the girls' friendship by sending Tracy to live with her father, a preoccupied businessman, but he refuses and claims he is too busy. After Evie's stay extends over two weeks, Melanie unsuccessfully attempts to contact Brooke, and then visits Brooke's home with Evie and Tracy. They find out that Brooke was hiding because of a botched plastic surgery. Evie asks Melanie to formally adopt her, but Melanie refuses. Angry and hurt, a tearful Evie storms off. Later at school, Evie turns her friends against Tracy, and Tracy slowly begins to realize the negative effects of her lifestyle when she is told that she will have to repeat the seventh grade.

While walking home from school, Brady offers Tracy a ride and takes her home where Melanie, Evie, and Brooke are sitting quietly in the living room waiting for her. Brooke confronts Tracy about her drug use and stealing, having been convinced that Tracy was the bad influence on Evie. Outraged, Tracy insists that Evie was the instigator, but the skeptical Brooke refuses to listen and announces that she is moving Evie to Ojai to keep her away from Tracy. Melanie defends Tracy's innocence but then Brooke pulls Tracy's sleeve up to show Melanie Tracy's self-harm scars. 

After a screaming match, Brooke and Evie leave. Tracy weeps in Melanie's arms and attempts to fight against her mother's embrace. She tearfully pleads with Melanie to let go, but Melanie persists and the two fall asleep together on Tracy's bed. The last scene depicts Tracy spinning alone and screaming on a park merry-go-round during the daytime.

Cast

 Evan Rachel Wood as Tracy Freeland
 Nikki Reed as Evie Zamora
 Holly Hunter as Melanie Freeland
 Jeremy Sisto as Brady
 Brady Corbet as Mason Freeland
 Deborah Kara Unger as Brooke LaLaine
 Sarah Clarke as Birdie
 Vanessa Hudgens as Noel
 Kip Pardue as Luke
 D. W. Moffett as Travis Freeland
 Jenicka Carey as Astrid
 Ulysses Estrada as Rafa
 Sarah Blakely-Cartwright as Medina
 Jasmine Di Angelo as Kayla
 Tessa Ludwick as Yumi
 Cynthia Ettinger as Cynthia
 Charles Duckworth as Javi

Production

Development
Director Catherine Hardwicke, who had worked prior as a film production designer, has called Nikki Reed a "surrogate daughter", having known her since she was five years old. Hardwicke had been in a long-term relationship with Reed's father for a time. The two began the screenplay as a comedy project which would be shot to video at minimal cost. The screenplay was written over a period of six days in January 2002, and quickly shifted into a tale of early teen angst and self-destruction in Los Angeles, with Tracy's character drawn from Reed's own recent experiences as an adolescent early teen. Reed said she specifically was inspired by experiencing her friends' arrests for dealing methamphetamine when she was thirteen years old.

Reed later stated in 2012 that she regrets the way she portrayed her family in the autobiographical film, saying, "I wrote this movie about them and their flaws and imperfections and what it was like growing up. It was from one kid's perspective and not a well rounded one. You get older and it's like, how dare I portray my father as being a totally vacant careless schmuck?"

After completing the script, Hardwicke pitched the idea to various producers she knew, but said that most were "terrified" of the project because of the subject matter. “All the characters are women, and it was going to be rated R and about a teenager. That does not check the boxes for any studio,” Hardwicke said of the difficulty of finding financiers for the film.

Casting
Hardwicke didn't think it would be fitting for Reed to play Tracy and auditioned hundreds of girls for the part. After becoming aware of Evan Rachel Wood, Hardwicke came to believe she could make the film only with Wood in the role of Tracy and only that year, with Wood at that age.

Hardwicke has said Holly Hunter's agreement to play the role of Tracy's mother Melanie was a key boost to bringing the production together; she met with Hunter in New York City to discuss the film, after which Hunter agreed to take the part. Hunter recalled: "I read the script and it was a very visceral experience. It's extremely raw, it was not a filled-in picture. It felt more like a feeling than anything else. And that's unusual for a script to communicate like that. It sort of declares itself, it comes at you. And the movie does, too. And that's unusual, for a movie to be able to have the same impetus on the screen that it has on the page." Brie Larson, who was herself 13 when the film released, auditioned for one of the parts in the film but was rejected.

Hardwicke subsequently managed to raise approximately $2 million, almost all through independent equity financing. Most of the adult actors were widely known and all of them reportedly agreed to low pay because they liked the script along with other members of the cast and crew. Wood and Reed were both 14 years old during filming (Wood turned 15 during the shoot).

Filming
Thirteen was shot on lower-cost super 16mm film over a period of 24 days. The camera was small, had a Panavision lens and was mostly hand-held by cinematographer Elliot Davis, which helped achieve a documentary, "cinéma vérité" style. Principal photography took place on location in Los Angeles, with Melrose Avenue, Hollywood Boulevard, and Venice Beach serving as filming locations. The Freeland home scenes were shot at a rented house in the San Fernando Valley. The outdoor school scenes were shot at Portola Middle School in Tarzana, California.

Some scenes in the film were carefully and colorfully lit, while others were shot only with whatever daylight could be had. Due to child labor laws, the underage performers were only allowed to work a regulated number of hours per day. This made for a frenetic production atmosphere, which cast and crew later said matched the script and added to the film's fast and emotionally taut pace. The film stock was transferred to the digital domain wherein the colors and saturation were highly manipulated for some segments. The beginning of the film was very slightly desaturated in the scenes before Tracy became friends with Evie. Once they became friends, the saturation was increased to a "glowy" effect, according to Hardwicke. After the scene where Evie and Tracy make out with Luke, the saturation slowly becomes less and less until the end of the film, especially after Evie is told that she can't live with Tracy anymore and Tracy is abandoned by the popular group.

The wardrobe worn by the girls was mostly their own. As filming progressed, the girls began dressing similarly without being asked to do so. The girls did not take any dangerous substances during the film. They are shown smoking cigarettes, but these were filled mostly with catnip. The crushed pills they are shown snorting from the cover of a children's book were harmless dietary supplements.

All of the scenes in which Tracy cut herself were shot in a single day; Wood recalled running to her brother for emotional support between some takes. Wood later described the shooting of the two make out scenes with Javi and Luke as "awkward" because her family was watching behind the scenes. Wood's mother requested that in the scenes with Tracy's bra exposed, that the front of her not be seen on camera. The whole scene with Luke was rendered in a single, long and uncut take with Wood, Reed and Pardue, but was tightly choreographed with several crew members, social workers and parents also in the small room, carefully staying either hidden or behind the camera as it panned more than 200°, showing all four walls.

Reception

Box office
Thirteen was picked up by Fox Searchlight Pictures after production was completed. The film debuted at the Sundance Film Festival on January 17, 2003. In the United States, it was given a limited release on August 20, 2003, in New York City, followed by its Los Angeles premiere on August 22. At the film's premiere screenings in Manhattan, brochures for Drug Abuse Resistance Education (D.A.R.E.) were distributed.

During its opening weekend, the film earned $116,260 at the U.S. box office, showing on 5 screens. Its release expanded to 243 theaters on September 19, 2003, and it went on to gross a total of $4,601,043 in the United States before concluding its theatrical run on December 18, 2003. In international markets, it grossed a further $5,527,917, making for a worldwide gross of $10.1 million.

Critical response
Film critic Roger Ebert awarded the film three-and-a-half out of four stars, writing: "Who is this movie for? Not for most 13-year-olds, that's for sure. The R rating is richly deserved, no matter how much of a lark the poster promises. Maybe the film is simply for those who admire fine, focused acting and writing; Thirteen sets a technical problem that seems insoluble, and meets it brilliantly, finding convincing performances from its teenage stars, showing [...] a parent who is clueless but not uncaring, and a world outside that bedroom window that has big bad wolves, and worse." Elvis Mitchell of The New York Times wrote: "The movie has the ebb and flow that come from material structured as a series of anecdotes—it doesn't build, and sometime feels as cluttered as a 13-year-old's bedroom. But that may be a byproduct of Catherine Hardwicke, making her directorial debut, working to layer incidents that are as far as possible from the weary set of clichés that inform pictures about teenagers. Usually, the protagonist is the bystander—in Thirteen, she's the fuse."

Writing for the Los Angeles Times, Manohla Dargis characterized the film as an "arty exploitation flick," adding: "Only audiences that have been locked inside a bomb shelter for the last 50 years will be shocked by what happens in Thirteen. The clothes are scantier and the music heavier on the bass since James Dean yelled "You're tearing me apart!" to his befuddled father in the mid-1950s melodrama Rebel Without a Cause. But the story about the anguished outsider trying to fit in no matter what hasn't changed much since the movies discovered the troubled teenager." The Washington Posts Laura Stepp noted in her review that the film "portrays adolescence at its most desperate. If you have a daughter in her early teens or almost there, the R-rated film will make you want to run home, hold her tightly for a few minutes and then lock her up while you struggle with all the questions the film raises but doesn't answer."

The Hollywood Reporter called the film "a chilling look at a pair of contemporary Valley girls—13-year-olds who are way beyond their years but also are nearly beyond repair," while the Chicago Tribunes Michael Wilmington called it "an excellent, unforgettable film," but also deemed it "extremely disturbing."

The film has an 81% approval rating on Rotten Tomatoes based on 154 reviews with an average rating of 7.29/10. The website's critical consensus reads: "An emotionally wrenching, not to mention terrifying, film about the perils of being a teenager." On Metacritic, the film has a weighted average score of 70 out of 100, based on 37 critics, indicating "generally favorable reviews".

Awards and nominations

Soundtrack

The score was written by Mark Mothersbaugh. An official soundtrack was released on August 19, 2003, by Nettwerk Records, which includes songs by Liz Phair, Clinic, Folk Implosion, Imperial Teen, Katy Rose, The Like, and MC 900 Ft. Jesus.

Track listing

References

Bibliography

External links
 
 
 
 
  Thirteen at The Encyclopedia of Lesbian Movie Scenes

2003 films
Films about teenagers
2003 directorial debut films
2003 drama films
2003 LGBT-related films
2000s teen drama films
American teen drama films
American teen LGBT-related films
Drama films based on actual events
Female bisexuality in film
Films about adolescence
Films about bullying
Films about depression
Films about drugs
Juvenile sexuality in films
Lesbian-related films
LGBT-related buddy films
LGBT-related drama films
LGBT-related films based on actual events
Middle school films
Films about mother–daughter relationships
Films about self-harm
Teen crime films
Films set in Los Angeles
Films shot in Los Angeles
Films directed by Catherine Hardwicke
Films scored by Mark Mothersbaugh
Fox Searchlight Pictures films
Working Title Films films
Films about puberty
Films shot in 16 mm film
2000s female buddy films
2000s coming-of-age drama films
2000s English-language films
2000s American films
2003 independent films
American independent films
Sundance Film Festival award winners